Gajanur may refer to:

Places
 Gajanur, a place in Karnataka, India 
 Gajanur, a place in Tamil Nadu, India

Film(s)
 Gajanura Gandu, a 1996 Indian Kannada film